Brian Scott McNeely (September 29, 1957 – May 2, 2015) was an American football coach.  He served as the head football coach at Idaho State University from 1992 to 1996, compiling a record of 21–34.  McNeely died of cancer on May 2, 2015.

Head coaching record

References

External links
 

1957 births
2015 deaths
Colorado Buffaloes football coaches
Idaho State Bengals football coaches
Indiana Hoosiers football coaches
Kansas Jayhawks football coaches
Junior college football coaches in the United States
Junior college football players in the United States
Wichita State University alumni
People from Comanche County, Kansas
People from Dodge City, Kansas
Deaths from cancer in Colorado